Sanaa Mazhar (Arabic: سناء مظهر; August 17, 1932 – August 6, 2018) was an Egyptian actress, one of the three girls in the film "Biyaa Al Jarid" with Magda al-Sabahi and Naima Akef, presented for many as one of the best cinematic works.

Mazhar was born on 17 August 1932. She married a man who died in the Yom Kippur war in 1973, and she never married again.

She was one of the three girls in "Bayaat Al Jarid" with Magda and Naima Akef. Thirteen works were enough to become known in Egypt by the audience. She acted in Dearer than My Life (1965). Sanaa acted with notable actresses like Hind Rostom, Nadia Lutfi, Najat Al Saghira, Shadia as well as notable actors like Salah Zulfikar and Rushdy Abaza. Participated in many historical works, playing roles as "Queen of Saba". She was very sensitive to some of the stars who asked her to change the color of her hair. She also used to design all the details of her artistic personality from her hairstyle, her hair ties and accessories.

Sanaa preferred to live quietly away from the glamor of stardom and fame and choose to live her life like any other ordinary Egyptian woman. She wore the hijab and retired completely in 1985. She was never ashamed by any of her prior works. It is reported that Yusuf Sibai had offered her roles in his film productions but she refused because it had scenes of lust. She died on the morning of 6 August 2018 at the age of 86 years.

References

External links 
 

1932 births
2018 deaths
Egyptian film actresses
Egyptian Muslims
20th-century Egyptian actresses